Tommi Viik (born 6 April 1987) is a Finnish professional footballer who played for Veikkausliiga side FC Haka.

Career
He was promoted in January 2006 to the senior team from FC Haka and released in January 2009.

External links
 Veikkausliiga Stats
 

1987 births
Living people
Finnish footballers
Association football goalkeepers
FC Haka players
Place of birth missing (living people)